Sinocyclocheilus malacopterus is a species of ray-finned fish in the genus Sinocyclocheilus.

References 

malacopterus
Fish described in 1985